Taylor Russell McKenzie (born July 18, 1994) is a Canadian actress. She has starred in the Netflix science fiction series Lost in Space (2018–2021). In film, she has starred in the critically acclaimed drama Waves (2019), for which she was nominated for the Independent Spirit Award for Best Supporting Female, and the horror film Escape Room (2019) and its 2021 sequel. For starring as a cannibalistic teenager in the road film Bones and All (2022), Russell won the Marcello Mastroianni Award.

Early life
Taylor Russell McKenzie was born on July 18, 1994 in Vancouver, British Columbia, and was raised in Vancouver, Toronto, and Montreal. Russell, who was born to a black father and a white mother, is biracial, and grew up mostly with her mother's side of the family. She recalled that growing up she felt unaccepted by her peers due to the color of her skin.  Her parents struggled financially, and were constantly on the move, uprooting their lives sixteen different times to follow her father's career. Despite this adversity, Russell mentioned how in her younger years "there was always an opportunity for reinvention, to create something new.”

As a child, Russell was already artistically inclined, at first, she wanted to pursue a career in ballet and later to become a painter. At eighteen, she took her first acting class and finally found her place. She used her work savings to buy a car, and would drive to Los Angeles, to audition. When her money ran out, she would return home to work, until she had enough earnings to audition again. That routine went on for four years, until she landed her first major TV role.

Career
Russell made her professional acting debut in 2012, with a small guest role in an episode of The CW medical drama series Emily Owens, M.D.. In 2014, she starred as Lark Voorhies in the Lifetime television film The Unauthorized Saved by the Bell Story, and Jennifer in the Disney XD television film Pants on Fire.

Russell made guest appearances in the CBC Television drama series Strange Empire (2015), the TNT science fiction series Falling Skies (2015), and the Freeform supernatural horror series Dead of Summer (2016). She also had roles in the teen drama film Before I Fall (2017) and the supernatural horror film Down a Dark Hall (2018).

In 2018, Russell earned recognition for her starring role as Judy Robinson in the science fiction series Lost in Space, a Netflix remake of the original 1965 series, for which she received critical praise and a nomination for the Saturn Award for Best Supporting Actress in a Streaming Presentation. Essence magazine stated that she "impresses in her role as a genius medic and doctor, who is compassionate and caring even in the face of danger." The series concluded in December 2021, after three seasons. On her ability to represent Black women in a science fiction series, Russell stated, "I know there are not a lot of women of color who are in the sci-fi genre and I feel really lucky that they chose me to hold that position on our show ... It's a huge honor for me and I don't take it lightly. It holds a really big place in my heart."

In 2019, Russell had her film breakthrough with the leading role of Zoey Davis in the psychological horror film Escape Room, which was a major commercial success, surpassing initial expectations and grossing $155.7 million. Also in 2019, Russell garnered critical acclaim for her starring role in the drama film Waves, which was released by A24 Films on November 15, 2019. IndieWire website dubbed her performance as a "revelation", going on to write that "While Waves is filled with excellent performances from its stacked cast, it's Russell that makes off with its most spectacular turn." The Los Angeles Times called her and her co-star Kelvin Harrison Jr. "two of the fastest-rising stars of their generation." For her performance in the film, Russell received the Gotham Independent Film Award for Breakthrough Performer and the Virtuoso Award at the Santa Barbara International Film Festival, among several others.

Russell starred in Thor Freudenthal's romantic drama Words on Bathroom Walls (2020), alongside Charlie Plummer, Andy Garcia, and AnnaSophia Robb, which earned positive responses both from critics and audiences (89 and 94% "fresh", respectively, as of January 2022). She also co-directed, wrote, and produced the documentary short film The Heart Still Hums, which earned acclaim and numerous awards, including the Palm Springs International ShortFest Award for Best Documentary Short.

In 2021, Russell starred in the comedy-drama film Dr. Bird's Advice for Sad Poets, and reprised the role of Zoey Davis in the Escape Room sequel Escape Room: Tournament of Champions, which grossed $51.8 million. Russell also directed part of the music video for Alexa Demie's "Leopard Limo (Archive LL11)", which also feature her voice.

In 2022, Russell starred alongside Timothée Chalamet in the romance horror film Bones and All, directed by Luca Guadagnino. The film premiered at the 79th Venice Film Festival on September 2 to positive reviews. Russell's performance in the film earned her widespread critical acclaim and the Marcello Mastroianni Award.

Fashion
Russell opened the SS23 Loewe collection, wearing a strapless black velvet dress. Creative director Jonathan Anderson, chose Russell after meeting her through mutual friend, Luca Guadagnino. Anderson said of the decision: "It was the start of a very special friendship and I just thought, she has to open the show. I'm so proud she agreed." In November 2022, she was named a Loewe Global Ambassador and is set to appear in the next pre-collection campaign. Following her red-carpet appearances on the Bones and All press tour, Vogue hailed her a "bold style renegade", writing "she’s in a total fashion league of her own, choosing unique looks that stray from the glitzy status quo."

Personal life
Russell currently lives in New York City. She is a fan of Patti Smith, and has a small lightning bolt tattooed on her inner wrist, emulating the one Smith has on her knee.

Filmography

Film

Television

Awards and nominations

References

External links
 

1994 births
Living people
21st-century Canadian actresses
Actresses from Vancouver
Black Canadian actresses
Canadian film actresses
Canadian television actresses